Parre is a comune (municipality) in the Province of Bergamo in the Italian region of Lombardy, located about  northeast of Milan and about  northeast of Bergamo.

The municipality of Parre contains the frazioni (subdivisions, mainly villages and hamlets) Ponte Selva, Sant' Alberto, and Martorasco.

Parre borders the following municipalities: Ardesio, Clusone, Piario, Ponte Nossa, Premolo, Villa d'Ogna.

Demographic evolution

References

External links
 www.comune.parre.bg.it/